"Looking for Love" is a song released under Karen Carpenter's name. It is regarded as the first release by what was to become the Carpenters. The music was written by Karen's brother, Richard Carpenter. It was recorded in 1966 and released on record label Magic Lamp, a small label with a limited budget. Even though Richard Carpenter does participate on the recording, it is printed "Karen Carpenter" on the recording contract and record label.

The record has now become a collectors' item and is worth between $2,000 to $2,500 as only 500 copies of the 45 rpm single were pressed. The single did not chart commercially and no music video was shot for the song (because promotional music videos were in their infancy at the time). This process led Magic Lamp to defunct, but the song, along with its B-side "I'll Be Yours", were later included on the 1991 4-CD box set From the Top.  According to the liner notes for the album From the Top, the master tapes for this recording and its flip side were lost in a fire at Joe Osborn's house in 1974.  All CD reissues have been made from a 45rpm copy owned by Richard Carpenter.

References

1966 debut singles
1966 songs
Karen Carpenter songs
Songs written by Richard Carpenter (musician)